Poul Frandsen (born 17 August 1953) is a Danish boxer. He competed in the men's light middleweight event at the 1976 Summer Olympics.

References

1953 births
Living people
Danish male boxers
Olympic boxers of Denmark
Boxers at the 1976 Summer Olympics
Sportspeople from Frederiksberg
Light-middleweight boxers